Thin film electronics may refer to:
Devices
Thin-film diode
Thin-film transistor
Organic field-effect transistor
Thin-film solar cell
Silicon thin-film cell
Thin-film-transistor liquid-crystal display
Thin-film memory
Printed electronics

Companies
Thin Film Electronics ASA